Lee Hyun-woo (born March 23, 1993) is a South Korean actor and singer. He began his career as a child actor when he was nine, and later appeared in the television series The Return of Iljimae (2009) and Queen Seondeok (2009). He also featured in Master of Study (2010) and To the Beautiful You (2012). Lee gained recognition with his role as a North Korean spy in the 2013 film Secretly, Greatly as well as a genius hacker in 2014's The Con Artists. He then played lead roles in Moorim School (2016) and  The Liar and His Lover (2017).

Career

2005–2011: Beginnings as a child actor
Lee began his career as a child actor, building up his resume by playing roles in a number of large-scale productions, such as The Legend, King Sejong the Great, The Return of Iljimae, and Queen Seondeok.

He rose to fame for his role in Master of Study, a Korean screen adaptation of Japanese manga Dragon Zakura. The same year, Lee took to the stage for the 2010 musical production of Footloose, where he played the leading role of Ren.

In 2011, he and K-pop singer Yoon Doo-joon (from B2ST) began hosting the music program Music on Top for cable channel jTBC. He was then featured in IU's music video for the song "You and I". Lee further expanded his acting scope in historical drama Gyebaek, revenge thriller Man from the Equator, and made a guest appearance in medical drama Brain.

2012–2018: Rising popularity

In 2012, Lee co-starred in To the Beautiful You, the Korean television adaptation of Japanese manga Hana-Kimi, with his role based on the character Shuichi Nakatsu. Despite low ratings during its domestic run, To the Beautiful You led to increased Korean Wave exposure for Lee in countries such as Singapore, Malaysia, Taiwan and China. He and co-star Hwang Kwang-hee were later announced as the new hosts of live music show Inkigayo.

His breakthrough continued when he landed a major role in 2013 box office hit Secretly, Greatly, an action-comedy film in which he played a North Korean undercover spy disguised as a high school boy. Lee also sang "Ode to Youth" for the film's soundtrack. He became the first male celebrity to be appointed ambassador of the Puchon International Film Festival. 

In 2014, he and real-life best friend Park Ji-bin (both were child actors and belong to the same agency) appeared in the travel/reality show Real Mate in Saipan. Lee next played a hacker in the heist movie The Con Artists.

He then starred in Northern Limit Line, a 2015 naval thriller about the Second Battle of Yeonpyeong. The film sold 6,024,894 tickets (grossing ), making it the most-watched Korean film in 2015.
 
In 2016, he starred in the fantasy youth drama Moorim School. Initially slated for 20 episodes, the drama was reduced to 16 episodes instead due to low ratings. 

In 2017, Lee starred in the drama The Liar and His Lover, the Korean remake of the Japanese manga Kanojo wa Uso o Aishisugiteru alongside Red Velvet's Joy.

In 2018, Lee released a digital single titled "Twenty-Six", prior to joining the army.

2022–present : Returning to the small screen 
In 2022, Lee returned to the small screen with the Netflix drama Money Heist: Korea – Joint Economic Area, his first work on the small screen in five years.

Personal life

Military service
On February 19, 2018, Lee began his mandatory military service as an active duty soldier. He completed his military service and was discharged on October 19, 2019.

Filmography

Film

Television series

Web series

Music video appearances

Hosting

Reality show

Theatre

Discography

Singles

Awards and nominations

References

External links
 
  at awesome.ent

1993 births
Living people
Male actors from Seoul
South Korean male child actors
South Korean male television actors
South Korean male film actors
Dongguk University alumni
South Korean male stage actors
21st-century South Korean male actors